Senator Harp may refer to:

John Harp (born 1952), Montana State Senate
Seth Harp (born 1943), Georgia State Senate
Thomas D. Harp (1824–1900), California State Senate
Toni Harp (born 1947), Connecticut State Senate